The Royal College of Dental Surgeons of Ontario (RCDSO) is the regulatory college for dentists in the province of Ontario, Canada. The college was incorporated on March 4, 1868, when royal assent was granted to An Act Respecting Dentistry in the Legislative Assembly of Ontario. Dental hygienists are separately regulated by the College of Dental Hygienists of Ontario.

History
Barnabas Day organized the Dental Association of Ontario (ODA) in 1867.
In 1868 the ODA lobbied the Ontario government to pass the Act Respecting Dentistry, by which the dentists must be licensed in order to practice.
This aimed to end tooth pulling by untrained fly-by-night charlatans.
The Royal College of Dental Surgeons of Ontario (RCDSO) was formed by ODA members to act as the governing body.
In 1869 the RCDSO opened the first dental school in Canada.
In 1893 Caroline Louise Josephine Wells became the first woman to graduate from the RCDSO, which made her the first Canadian woman to graduate from any dental school.

References

Sources

Dental organizations based in Canada
Professional associations based in Ontario
1868 establishments in Ontario
Royal colleges
Ontario
Organizations based in Toronto